Esfandan (also Romanized as Esfandān; also known as Estandān) is a village in Bahmayi-ye Sarhadi-ye Gharbi Rural District, Dishmok District, Kohgiluyeh County, Kohgiluyeh and Boyer-Ahmad Province, Iran. At the 2006 census, its population was 976, in 194 families.

References 

Populated places in Kohgiluyeh County